The 2022 Global Touring Car Championship (commercially known as the 2022 Sasol GTC Championship) was the seventh season of the South African Global Touring Car Championship. The season was contested over seven rounds, starting at the Killarney Motor Racing Complex on March 4 and ending at the Zwartkops Raceway on October 15.

Robert Wolk claimed his second successive GTC championship and Leyton Fourie took the honours in the GTC Supacup class for the first time.

Calendar

Results and standings

Championship standings
Points system

Drivers

References

External links
Series website

Global Touring Car Championship
Global Touring Car Championship